A subsistence crisis occurs when individuals or communities are unable to obtain the basic necessities for survival due to factors such as inflation, drought, war, or economic instability, which may be caused either naturally or by human actions. This threatens the food supplies and the survival prospects of large numbers of people. If it is extremely severe and many lives are lost, it is considered a famine. A subsistence crisis can be considered genuine if it is visible in demographic data.

It was in France that the concept of a subsistence crisis was first formulated by Meuvret in 1946 and greatly popularized by Goubert in 1960 through his influential study of the Beauvaisis in Beauvais. The theory of subsistence crises, in its contemporary guise, was first formulated by Meuvret in 1946. As an economic historian and specialist in price history, Meuvret was struck by the coincidence between high prices and the increase in the number of deaths in the region of Gien in 1709–10. He then posed the problem of the nature of demographic crises, very tentatively at first, since he thought it was a hopeless quest to try to distinguish statistically between phenomena that were so closely associated: namely, mortality through simple inanition (starvation); mortality caused by disease, though attributable to malnutrition; and mortality by contagion, which in turn was linked to the scarcity that helped both spawn diseases and spread them through the migration of poor beggars.

Examples of subsistence crises
France, 1788–1789, in which two years of crop failures and low yields caused a grain shortage
The Year Without a Summer of 1816
The Great Irish Famine, 1845 to 1849

See also
 Famine

References

Famines
Food politics